Lisa Michelle Cornelius is a Canadian actress. She is most noted for her role in the web series Band Ladies, for which she was a Canadian Screen Award nominee for Best Lead Performance in a Digital Program or Series at the 9th Canadian Screen Awards in 2021.

Career 
Cornelius has appeared in supporting or guest roles in the film The Best Man Holiday, the television series Black Mirror, 12 Monkeys, American Gothic and The Handmaid's Tale. and the web series Star Trek: Short Treks.

She is the former co-chair of ACTRA's diversity and inclusion committee.

Filmography

Film

Television

References

External links

21st-century Canadian actresses
Canadian television actresses
Canadian film actresses
Canadian web series actresses
Black Canadian actresses
Living people
Year of birth missing (living people)